The 1958 UK & Ireland Greyhound Racing Year was the 32nd year of greyhound racing in the United Kingdom and Ireland.

Roll of honour

Summary
The National Greyhound Racing Society (the management branch of the National Greyhound Racing Club agreed a deal with the BBC to provide an annual greyhound event which would be shown live on Sportsview. The race would be known as the Sportsview BBC Television Trophy with the venues to be changed each year. The first competition was at Wimbledon over 500 yards but it was soon discovered that the distance was too short for the viewers to remain interested, which resulted in a switch to longer distances the following year. 
The inaugural event was claimed by trainer Leslie Reynolds with a 20-1 shot called Town Prince.

Pigalle Wonder was voted Greyhound of the Year, after a year that included winning the 1958 English Greyhound Derby at White City, Cesarewitch at West Ham Stadium and Pall Mall Stakes at Harringay Stadium.

Competitions
Pigalle Wonder's victory in the Pall Mall included a time of 29.03 seconds for 525 yards, which was not beaten for years. Another time he set at Wembley (28.78sec) stood for almost twenty years until the distance was changed to metres. In the TV Trophy he gained all of the attention despite finishing fourth to Town Prince when expected to win, at odds of 1-4f. He had previously won his heat at Powderhall Stadium in a new track record time of 27.97.

There was a major gamble on Our Defence in the Welsh Greyhound Derby final, that had been moved to October due to the Commonwealth Games using the venue in the summer. Because of very wet weather the newly laid track surface became a quagmire with straw being laid on top. Despite this the gamble was landed by the owner trainer, Dr Dennis O'Brien.

Tracks
The Franklin family took sole control of Yarmouth Stadium following the death of Clifford Yaxley and the Arms Park in Cardiff was taken over for the Commonwealth Games and afterwards the circuit was re-laid before the Welsh Derby took place.

News
Harringay Arena was converted into a food storage facility following the sale of the venue the previous year by the Greyhound Racing Association (GRA). The greyhound companies continued to complain at the 10% tax imposed on betting. Wimbledon trainer Paddy Fortune died and his kennels were taken over by George Waterman.   Another change came when Sidney Orton retired and his son Clare Orton (a trainer at Clapton) took up his position at Wimbledon. Clare had been a trainer in his own right for nearly ten years.

The GRA senior vet James Bateman was awarded the Victory Medal by the Royal College of Veterinary Surgeons. He had been successful in fitting a plastic scaphoid bone in a greyhound. 

Con Stevens applied to the NGRC for a rule change concerning disqualifications. He believes that ungenuine greyhounds in addition to fighters should be disqualified by Racing Managers.

Ireland
The Irish Greyhound Board (Bord na gCon) in Limerick was given the responsibility of all tracks in Ireland by the Dáil Éireann, with the exception of the Ulster tracks that would remain under the jurisdiction of the Irish Coursing Club. The Bord na gCon was established under the Greyhound Industry Act of 1958 with a number of aims. The body was formed to regulate the industry, operate a tote betting system, licence and authorise each stadium, its officials, and its on-course bookmakers, and promote the sport through advertising and prize grants. The new Board includes Dr P.J. Maguire and Captain John Ross.

Harold's Cross re-introduced sales trials and called in British auctioneers Aldridges.  Mrs Olive Tasker took the 1958 Irish Greyhound Derby winner Colonel Perry back to England and the greyhound went on to win the Midland Flat with John Bassett.

Principal UK races

	

(dh) - dead heat

References 

Greyhound racing in the United Kingdom
Greyhound racing in the Republic of Ireland
UK and Ireland Greyhound Racing Year
UK and Ireland Greyhound Racing Year
UK and Ireland Greyhound Racing Year
UK and Ireland Greyhound Racing Year